The Northampton-class cruisers were a group of six heavy cruisers built for the United States Navy, and commissioned between 1928 and 1931.

The Northamptons saw much action in World War II. Three (Northampton, Chicago, and Houston) were lost during the war.  The other three were decommissioned soon after the end of the war, and scrapped in 1959–1961.

Design
The Northamptons were a reaction to the weight and cost of the immediately preceding , differing in several ways. The Pensacolas mounted a main battery of 10  guns in four turrets, a twin and superfiring triple fore and aft. In contrast, the Northamptons mounted 9  guns in three triple turrets, two forward and one aft, the layout followed in all subsequent U.S. heavy cruisers.

Although armor was increased, the Northamptons turned out to be lighter than the Pensacolas, and nearly 1,000 tons below the treaty limitations. Freeboard was increased in the Northamptons by adopting a high forecastle, which was extended aft in the last three for use as flagships. These ships were also the first U.S. ships to adopt a hangar for aircraft, and bunks instead of hammocks. Their lighter-than-expected weight caused them to roll excessively, which necessitated the fitting of deep bilge keels. The immediately-following  was essentially a modified Northampton.

Ships in class

See also
 List of cruisers of the United States Navy

References

External links

Global Security.org – Northampton class cruiser
Global Security.org – Northampton class cruiser specifications

Cruiser classes